was a village located in Asakura District, Fukuoka Prefecture, Japan.

The village gave its name to a style of pottery called Koishiwara ware. 

On March 28, 2005, Koishiwara, along with the village of Hōshuyama (also from Asakura District), was merged to create the village of Tōhō.

External links
 Tōhō official website 

Dissolved municipalities of Fukuoka Prefecture
Populated places disestablished in 2005
2005 disestablishments in Japan